is a 1996 Japanese film directed by Yoshimitsu Morita. The film is about a young man and woman who fall in love through the internet.

Release
Haru was released on March 9, 1996 where it was distributed by Toho. Haru was shown at the Asia Pacific Media Center in Los Angeles on September 4, 1996.

Awards
18th Yokohama Film Festival 
Won: Best Actress - Eri Fukatsu
Won: Best Screenplay - Yoshimitsu Morita
4th Best Film

References

Bibliography

External links

1996 films
Films directed by Yoshimitsu Morita
1990s Japanese-language films
Films scored by Toshihiko Sahashi
1990s Japanese films